Kashuf Ali (born 27 January 1992) is a British professional boxer who has held the IBF European heavyweight title since May 2021.

Personal life 
Ali is of Pakistani origin and a Sufi muslim.

Controversies 

On 30 March 2019, Ali faced David Price. The bout culminated in the fifth round, when Ali tackled and bit Price while he was on the canvas. The referee immediately called for a disqualification and awarded Price with the victory.

References 

Living people
1992 births
Sportspeople from Solihull
English male boxers
British sportspeople of Pakistani descent
English Sufis